Three miles north of Pitlochry by the A9 road, the Pass of Killiecrankie (Gaelic: Coille Chneagaidh), is a gorge lying between  Ben Vrackie and Tenandry Hill in Perth and Kinross on the River Garry.

The river-gorge traverses the pass over the course of a mile, and above it, the road and the railway, with the village of Killiecrankie at the north end. Much of the area is owned by the National Trust for Scotland.

About a mile toward the village of Killiecrankie, the Battle of Killiecrankie took place in 1689.

There was also a ship, a 3-masted bark named the Pass of Killiecrankie of the Killiecrankie line. The ship was built in 1893 and later renamed Stifinder.

Killiecrankie is part of the Loch Tummel National Scenic Area (NSA),  one of 40 such areas in Scotland, which are defined so as to identify areas of exceptional scenery and to ensure its protection by restricting certain forms of development.

Footnotes

External links 

Mountain passes of Scotland